The 1986–87 Indiana Hoosiers men's basketball team represented Indiana University. Their head coach was Bobby Knight, who was in his 16th year. The team played its home games in Assembly Hall in Bloomington, Indiana, and was a member of the Big Ten Conference. The team is noted for having achieved much success without much NBA talent.

The Hoosiers finished the regular season with an overall record of 24–4 and a conference record of 15–3, finishing 1st in the Big Ten Conference. As Big Ten Conference co-champions with Purdue, IU was named a one-seed in the 1987 NCAA Tournament. They won solidly over Fairfield, Auburn, and Duke in NCAA play, but they needed Ricky Calloway's rebound lay-in to beat LSU, 77–76, to get to the Final Four. Once there, Indiana beat one-seed UNLV, 97–93, despite ten 3-pointers by UNLV guard Freddie Banks, which is still the Final Four record.

In the championship game versus Syracuse, which featured three future long-time professional players, Indiana trailed 73–70 in the last minute. However, two late shots by Keith Smart, including the last at 0:05, won the game for Indiana.

"The greatness in this team", coach Bob Knight said, "may be the greatness no other team here has had, to the degree that this one did – almost a total resolve not to recognize or be a part of defeat. This team played the last five minutes of critical games as well as I've ever seen a team play."

Roster

Schedule/Results

|-
!colspan=8 style=| Regular Season
|-

|-
!colspan=8 style=| NCAA Tournament

Rankings

Awards and honors
 Steve Alford, Big Ten Player of the Year
 Dean Garrett, Big Ten Freshman of the Year
 Bobby Knight, Naismith College Coach of the Year
 Keith Smart, NCAA Men's MOP Award

Team players drafted into the NBA

References

Indiana Hoosiers
Indiana Hoosiers men's basketball seasons
NCAA Division I men's basketball tournament championship seasons
NCAA Division I men's basketball tournament Final Four seasons
Indiana
1986 in sports in Indiana
1987 in sports in Indiana